Daniel Noble (1838–1903) was a Confederate prisoner at Camp Douglas before becoming a Union Navy sailor in the American Civil War and a recipient of the U.S. military's highest decoration, the Medal of Honor, for his actions at the Battle of Mobile Bay.

Background
Born in 1838 in Breathitt County, Kentucky, Noble was a Confederate prisoner of war at Camp Douglas, Illinois when he joined the Navy. Despite intense fire, the boat crew was able to pull ten Tecumseh men from the water. For this action, Noble was awarded the Medal of Honor a year and a half later, on January 15, 1866. Five other members of the boat crew also received the medal: Seaman James Avery, Quarter Gunner Charles Baker, Ordinary Seaman John C. Donnelly, Captain of the Forecastle John Harris, and Seaman Henry Johnson.

Citation
Noble's official Medal of Honor citation reads:
As landsman on board the U.S.S. Metacomet, Noble served among the boat's crew which went to the rescue of the U.S. Monitor Tecumseh when that vessel was struck by a torpedo in passing enemy forts in Mobile Bay, 5 August 1864. Noble braved the enemy fire which was said by the admiral [ David Farragut ] to be "one of the most galling" he had ever seen and aided in rescuing from death 10 of the crew of the Tecumseh, thereby eliciting the admiration of both friend and foe.

References

External links 
 

1838 births
1903 deaths
People from Bath County, Kentucky
People of Kentucky in the American Civil War
Union Navy sailors
United States Navy Medal of Honor recipients
American Civil War recipients of the Medal of Honor